Henn is a both a surname and an Estonian masculine given name. 

Notable people with the surname include:

As a given name
 Henn-Ants Kurg (1898–1943), Estonian military colonel and diplomat
 Henn Pärn (born 1941), Estonian politician
 Henn Põlluaas (born 1960), Estonian politician
 Henn Põlluste (born 1952), Estonian wrestler and wrestling coach
 Henn Saari (1924–1999), Estonian linguist
 Henn Treial (1905–1941), Estonian journalist, editor and politician 

As a surname
 Alexander Henn, German anthropologist
 Arthur Henn (disambiguation)
 Bernhart Henn (1817–1865), American politician
 Carrie Henn (born 1976), actress
 Christian Henn (born 1964), road racing cyclist
 Dirk Henn (born 1960), German-style board game designer
 Guy Henn (1909–1998), Australian doctor and politician
 Hans Henn (20th century), West German bobsledder
 Harry George Henn (1919–1994), American law professor
 Henry Henn (1858–1931), Church of England bishop
 Jaco Henn (born 1974), South African sport shooter
 John Henn (born 1941), American volleyball player
 Luca Henn (born 1997), German racing cyclist
 Mark Henn (born 1958), Disney animator
 Matthias Henn (born 1985), German footballer
 Pablo Henn (born 1982), Argentine rugby player
 Percy Henn (1865–1955), clergyman and teacher
 Preston Henn (1931–2017), American entrepreneur
 Sean Henn (born 1981), baseball player
 Steve Henn (born 1976), American poet and editor
 Sydney Henn (1861–1936), British knight
 Thomas Rice Henn (1901–1974), literary critic
 William Henn (c.1720–1796), Irish judge

See also
 Hehn and Hen (disambiguation)
 Henn., taxonomic author abbreviation of Paul Christoph Hennings (1841–1908), German mycologist and herbarium curator
 Henn-Collins
 Henna (disambiguation)

German-language surnames
Estonian masculine given names